The Associated Press poll (AP poll) provides weekly rankings of the top 25 NCAA teams in one of three Division I college sports: football, men's basketball and women's basketball. The rankings are compiled by polling 62 sportswriters and broadcasters from across the nation. Each voter provides their own ranking of the top 25 teams, and the individual rankings are then combined to produce the national ranking by giving a team 25 points for a first place vote, 24 for a second place vote, and so on down to 1 point for a twenty-fifth place vote. Ballots of the voting members in the AP poll are publicized.

College football

The football poll is released Sundays at 2 pm Eastern time during the season, unless ranked teams have not finished their games.

History
The AP college football poll's origins go back to the 1930s. The news media began running their own polls of sports writers to determine, by popular opinion, the best college football teams in the country. One of the earliest such polls was conducted by the AP in November 1934. In 1935, AP sports editor Alan J. Gould declared a three-way tie for national champion in football between Minnesota, Princeton, and Southern Methodist. Minnesota fans protested and a number of Gould's colleagues led by Charles "Cy" Sherman suggested he create a poll of sports editors instead of only using his own list and the next year the weekly AP college football poll was born, and has run continuously from 1936.

Due to the long-standing historical ties between individual college football conferences and high-paying bowl games like the Rose Bowl and Orange Bowl, the NCAA had not held a tournament or championship game to determine the national champion of what is now the highest division, NCAA Division I, Football Bowl Subdivision (the Division I, Football Championship Subdivision and lower divisions do hold championship tournaments).  As a result, the public and the media began to acknowledge the leading vote-getter in the final AP poll as the national champion for that season.

While the AP poll currently lists the Top 25 teams in the nation, from 1936 to 1988, the wire service only ranked twenty teams, except from 1961 to 1967, when only ten teams were recognized. The AP expanded to the current 25 teams in 1989.

The AP began conducting a preseason poll in 1950.

At the end of the 1947 season, the AP released an unofficial post-bowl poll which differed from the regular season final poll. Until the 1968 college football season, the final AP poll of the season was released following the end of the regular season, with the lone exception of the 1965 season. In 1964, Alabama was named the national champion in the final AP Poll following the completion of the regular season, but lost in the Orange Bowl to Texas, leaving Arkansas as the only undefeated, untied team after the Razorbacks defeated Nebraska in the Cotton Bowl. In 1965, the AP's decision to wait to crown its champion paid handsomely, as top-ranked Michigan State lost to UCLA in the Rose Bowl, number two Arkansas lost to LSU in the Cotton Bowl, and fourth-ranked Alabama defeated third-ranked Nebraska in the Orange Bowl, vaulting the Crimson Tide to the top of the AP's final poll (Michigan State was named national champion in the final UPI Coaches Poll, which did not conduct a post-bowl poll).

Beginning in 1968, the post bowl game poll became permanent and the AP championship reflected the bowl game results. The UPI did not follow suit with the coaches' poll until the 1974 season.

No. 1 vs. No. 2
Through the 2018 season, the number one ranked team has faced the number two ranked team 52 times since the inception of the AP poll in 1936. The number one team has a record of  against the number two team.

AP Poll inclusion in the BCS
In 1997, the Bowl Championship Series (BCS) was developed to try to unify the poll results by picking two teams for a "real" national championship game. For the first several years the AP Poll factored in the determination of the BCS rankings, along with other factors including the Coaches Poll and computer-based polls. Because of a series of controversies surrounding the BCS, the AP demanded in December, 2004, that its poll no longer be used in the BCS rankings, and so the 2004–2005 season was the last season that the AP Poll was used for this purpose.

In the 2003 season, the BCS system broke down when the final BCS standings ranked the University of Southern California (USC) at No. 3 while the two human polls in the system had ranked USC at No. 1. As a result, USC did not play in the BCS' designated national championship game. USC (who had earlier in the season lost in triple-overtime to an unranked U of California, 31-24) went on to decisively defeat No. 4 ranked Michigan in the Rose Bowl, while No. 2 Louisiana State University (LSU) (who had lost to Florida earlier in the season) defeated the No. 1 Oklahoma Sooners (who had lost the Big 12 championship game to Kansas State) in a national title game. As a result, the AP Poll kept USC at No. 1 while the Coaches Poll was contractually obligated to select the winner of the BCS game as the No. 1 team.  The resulting split national title was the very problem that the BCS was created to solve, and has been widely considered an embarrassment.

USC went on to a win easily over Oklahoma in the Orange Bowl while Auburn and Utah both won their bowl games, leaving three undefeated teams at the end of the season. Also, in that same year, Texas made up late ground on California (Cal) in the BCS standings and as a result grabbed a high-payout, at-large spot in the Rose Bowl. Previous to that poll, Cal had been ranked ahead of Texas in both human polls and the BCS poll. Going into their final game, the Golden Bears were made aware that while margin of victory did not affect computer rankings, it did affect human polls and just eight voters changing their vote could affect the final standings. Both teams won their game that week, but the Texas coach, Mack Brown, had made a public effort to lobby for his team to be moved higher in the ranking. When the human polls were released, Texas remained behind Cal, but it had closed the gap enough so that the BCS poll (which determines placement) placed Texas above Cal, angering both Cal and its conference, the Pac-10. The final poll positions had been unchanged with Cal at No. 4 AP, No. 4 coaches, and No. 6 computers polls and Texas at No. 6 AP, No. 5 coaches, and No. 4 computer polls. The AP Poll voters were caught in the middle because their vote changes were automatically publicized, while the votes of the Coaches poll were kept confidential. Although there had been a more substantial shift in the votes of the Coaches Poll, the only clear targets for the ire of fanatical fans were the voters in the AP Poll. While officials from both Cal and the Pac-10 called for the coaches' votes to be publicized, the overtures were turned down and did little to solve the problem of AP voters. Cal went on to lose to Texas Tech in the Holiday Bowl. Texas defeated Michigan in the Rose Bowl.

Many members of the press who voted in the AP Poll were upset by the controversy and, at the behest of its members, the AP asked that its poll no longer be used in the BCS rankings. The 2004 season was the last season that the AP Poll was used in the BCS rankings. It was replaced in the BCS equation by the newly created Harris Interactive College Football Poll.

Final AP football polls

Other media football polls
The AP Poll is not the only college football poll. The other major poll is the Coaches Poll, which has been published by several organizations: the United Press (1950–1957), the United Press International (1958–1990), USA Today (1991–present), CNN (1991–1996), and ESPN (1997–2005). Having two major polls has led to numerous "split" national titles, where the two polls disagreed on the No. 1 team. This has occurred on eleven different occasions (1954, 1957, 1965, 1970, 1973, 1974, 1978, 1990, 1991, 1997, 2003).

College basketball
In Division I men's and women's college basketball, the AP Poll is largely just a tool to compare schools throughout the season and spark debate, as it has no bearing on postseason play. Generally, all top 25 teams in the poll are invited to the men's and women's NCAA basketball tournament, also known as March Madness. The poll is usually released every Monday and voters' ballots are publicized.

Men's basketball

The AP began compiling a ranking of the top 20 college men's basketball teams during the 1948–1949 season. It has issued this poll continuously since the 1950–1951 season. Beginning with the 1989-1990 season, the poll expanded to 25 teams. Kentucky has the highest % of AP poll top 25 appearances, top 10 appearances, top 5 appearances, as well as preseason and end of season appearances.

Women's basketball

The women's basketball poll began during the 1976–1977 season, and was initially compiled by Mel Greenberg and published by The Philadelphia Inquirer. At first, it was a poll of coaches conducted via telephone, where coaches identified top teams and a list of the Top 20 team was produced. The initial list of coaches did not include Pat Summitt, who asked to join the group, not to improve her rankings, but because of the lack of media coverage. Summitt believed it would be a good way to stay on top of who the top teams were outside of her own schedule. The poll continued to be a top 20 poll through 1989. The number was increased to 25 in 1990 and subsequent years.

The contributors continued to be coaches until 1994, when the AP took over administration of the poll from Greenberg, and switched to a panel of writers. In 1994, Tennessee started out as No. 1 in the polls with Connecticut at No. 4. After losses by the No. 2 and No. 3 teams, Tennessee and Connecticut were ranked No. 1 and No. 2, headed into a showdown, scheduled as a special event on Martin Luther King day, the only women's basketball game scheduled on that day. Because of the unusual circumstances, the decision was made to hold off the AP voting for one day, to ensure it would be after the game. Connecticut won the game, and moved into first place in the AP poll, published on Tuesday for the only time. (Connecticut went on to complete an undefeated season.) Over the history of the poll, over 255 coaches have had a team represented in polls.

NFL football

Beginning in 2012, the AP began issuing a weekly pro football ranking, the AP Pro32 rankings.

Notes

See also

 2020 NCAA Division I FBS football rankings
 Bowl Championship Series
 Coaches' Poll
 College football national championships in NCAA Division I FBS
 College Football Playoff
 Dickinson System
 Game of the Century (college football)
 Grantland Rice Award
 Harris Interactive College Football Poll
 List of college football teams by weekly appearances atop AP Poll
 List of NCAA college football rankings
 Mythical national championship
 NAIA Coach's Poll

References

External links
 The Associated Press Top 25 College Football Poll at The Associated Press
 The Associated Press Top 25 Men's College Basketball Poll at The Associated Press
 Index AP Ballot Information by Voter and Team for Football/Men's Basketball
 AP Football Poll voters
 AP Men's Basketball Poll voters
 Archive of all AP weekly polls for football and men's/women's basketball
 List of all Final AP football Poll results and champions

Bowl Championship Series
College men's basketball rankings in the United States
College football rankings